The 1960–61 St. John's Redmen basketball team represented St. John's University during the 1960–61 college basketball season.

Roster

Schedule

|-
!colspan=9 style="background:#FF0000; color:white;"| Regular Season

|-
!colspan=9 style="background:#FF0000; color:white;"| NCAA Tournament

References

St. John's Red Storm men's basketball seasons
St. John's
St. John's Redmen basketball team 1960-61
St. John's Redmen basketball team 1960-61